Monkmoor is a suburb located in the north-east of the town of Shrewsbury, Shropshire, England. It is connected to the suburbs of Underdale and Abbey Foregate. The ward's population in 2015 was 4,451. Much of Monkmoor is residential; there is approximately 1,904 households in the suburb and 1,939 total dwellings.

Amenities
The suburb has two public houses, The Monkmoor and The Abbey, named after the nearby Shrewsbury Abbey. It also has a post office, a Church of England church (St Peter's), a chip shop, an Indian and Chinese takeaway and a convenience store. It is also home to Shrewsbury Police Station. There is a primary school, The Wilfred Owen School, and a specialist academy. There was formerly a secondary Monkmoor Girls' School in the suburb, however it closed in the 20th century and is now a listed building, converted to housing.

Sport
To the rear of the former school is Monkmoor Recreation Ground, a large recreation ground with football, rugby and tennis facilities.

Shrewsbury Town F.C. had their first ground on the former Racecourse Ground in Monkmoor, where they hosted 51 matches over 3 years (1886-89).

Notable people
George Butler Lloyd (1854-1930), local Conservative MP for Shrewsbury 1913-22, was born at now-demolished Monkmoor Hall.
Wilfred Owen (1893-1918), war poet, lived in family home at 71 Monkmoor Road (house named 'Mahim'), where there is a commemorative plaque.

Transport
The Wolverhampton–Shrewsbury line runs through the suburb under a road bridge, and Shrewsbury railway station is located 1.2 miles to the west of Monkmoor. The suburb is served by the 1 bus route. The route connects the suburb to Shrewsbury town centre.

See also
Abbey Foregate
Underdale, Shrewsbury

References

Suburbs of Shrewsbury